Face A / Face B is a 2002 album by the Belgian singer Axelle Red.

The singles released from the album were "Je Me Fâche", "Venez Vers Moi", "Pas Maintenant", "Toujours" and "Gloria".

Track listing

 "Venez vers moi" (Axelle Red, Richard Seff) – 4:52
 "Voilà tout ce qu'on peut faire" (Red, R. Seff) – 4:18
 "Vole" (Red) – 5:17
 "Blanche Neige" (Red) – 6:01
 "Je me fâche" (Red) – 4:55
 "Toujours" (Red, Daniel Seff) – 4:14
 "Amants de minuits" (Red, Christophe Vervoort) – 4:26
 "Disco grenouille" (Red) – 5:31
 "Gloria" (Red, Vervoort) – 4:04
 "Pas maintenant" (Red, D. Seff) – 3:39
 "T'es ma maman" (Red, Vervoort) – 3:50
 "Bon Anniversaire" (Red, Vervoort) – 12:55

Certifications

Charts

References

2002 albums
Axelle Red albums
Virgin Records albums